Rokan-kiri River is a river in Riau province, central part of Sumatra island, Indonesia, about 1100 km northwest of the capital Jakarta.
It is a tributary of the Rokan River.

Geography
The river flows in the central area of Sumatra with predominantly tropical rainforest climate (designated as Af in the Köppen-Geiger climate classification). The annual average temperature in the area is 23 °C. The warmest month is August, when the average temperature is around 24 °C, and the coldest is January, at 22 °C. The average annual rainfall is 2742 mm. The wettest month is November, with an average of 401 mm rainfall, and the driest is June, with 85 mm rainfall.

See also
List of rivers of Indonesia
List of rivers of Sumatra

References

Rivers of Riau
Rivers of Indonesia